Advanced Land Observing Satellite 3 (ALOS-3), also called Daichi 3, was a 3-ton Japanese satellite launched on March 7 2023. It was to succeed the optical sensor PRISM (Panchromatic Remote-sensing Instruments for Stereo Mapping) carried on the ALOS satellite, which operated from 2006 to 2011. The ALOS-2 satellite and the future ALOS-4 satellite meanwhile carries a synthetic-aperture radar.

The satellite was launched as the payload on the first launch of the H3 rocket in March 2023. A failure of the second stage engine to ignite led to the rocket along with its payload ALOS-3 being destroyed by use of Flight Termination System (FTS) to prevent risk of falling debris.

Spacecraft details
ALOS-3 has a mass of 3 tonnes, and 7 reaction wheels.

Launch
ALOS-3 launched from Tanegashima, Japan by a H3 rocket on 7 March 2023. Previously the launch was scheduled for 17 February but was aborted seconds before liftoff.

Mission and sensors
If successfully launched, ALOS-3 would have been an Earth observation satellite and was to be used to monitor natural disasters as well as for cartography. ALOS-3 carried OPS (OPtical Sensor), a multi-band optical camera which is an upgrade from the PRISM sensor. In addition to the RGB and infrared band covered by the predecessor ALOS satellite, ALOS-3 has two additional bandwidths: coastal and red edge. Coastal allows observation underwater up to a depth of 30m, while red edge was to be used to monitor vegetation growth.

See also

 2023 in spaceflight

References

External links
 
 H3×ALOS-3 Special Site (JAXA)
 ALOS-3, PASCO CORPORATION

Earth observation satellites of Japan
JAXA
2023 in Japan
Spacecraft launched in 2023